The War and Peace Memorial Park and Theme Hall is a memorial in Cijin District, Kaohsiung, Taiwan. It commemorates Republic of China Armed Forces who died during the Chinese Civil War, Korean War and Pacific War.

History
The idea for the establishment of the memorial park was mentioned by Kaohsiung Mayor Chen Chu on 7 June 2008. The park was opened on 20 May 2009.

Architecture
The park consists of the memorial wall of light in the main building, memorial pillars of lanterns, monument plaza and the heart of echoes. The outer wall of the main building depicts picture of men wearing the uniform of Imperial Japanese Army, National Revolutionary Army and People's Liberation Army. Outside the main building lies a memorial stale, square, park and observatory.

See also
 List of tourist attractions in Taiwan

References

2009 establishments in Taiwan
Buildings and structures in Kaohsiung
Memorial parks in Taiwan